Jane Mayes (born 10 January 1989, Esbjerg) is a Danish-British handball goalkeeper. She plays for Team Esbjerg and the British national team, and competed at the 2012 Summer Olympics in London.

Early life
Mayes was born on 10 January 1989 in Esbjerg to Richard John Mayes and Pia Mayes.

Mayes has played handball since the age of six.

Her father, Richard John Mayes died of lung cancer in 1999.

In 2007, she broke into the national team for handball.

In 2010, she was selected by Team GB to be part of a pool of potential
handball Olympians and lost 6 stone to make the team.

2012 Olympics

She competed for Team GB in Women's Handball at the 2012 Summer Olympics in London.

References

External links

Danish female handball players
British female handball players
1989 births
Living people
Handball players at the 2012 Summer Olympics
Olympic handball players of Great Britain
British people of Danish descent
People from Esbjerg
Sportspeople from the Region of Southern Denmark